This is a list of medalists at the IBA Women's World Boxing Championships.

Pinweight
 −45 kg: 2001–2002
 −46 kg: 2005–2008

Minimumweight
 −48 kg: 2022–

Light flyweight
 −48 kg: 2001–2019
 −50 kg: 2022–

Flyweight
 −51 kg: 2001–2002
 −50 kg: 2005–2008
 −51 kg: 2010–2019
 −52 kg: 2022–

Light bantamweight
 −52 kg: 2005–2008

Bantamweight
 −54 kg: 2001–

Featherweight
 −57 kg: 2001–

Lightweight
 −60 kg: 2001–

Light welterweight
 −63.5 kg: 2001–2002
 −63 kg: 2005–2008
 −64 kg: 2010–2019
 −63 kg: 2022–

Welterweight
 −67 kg: 2001–2002
 −66 kg: 2005–2008
 −69 kg: 2010–2019
 −66 kg: 2022–

Light middleweight
 −71 kg: 2001–2002
 −70 kg: 2005–2008, 2022–

Middleweight
 −75 kg: 2001–

Light heavyweight
 −81 kg: 2001–2002
 −80 kg: 2005–2008
 −81 kg: 2010–

Heavyweight
 −90 kg: 2001
 +81 kg: 2002
 −86 kg: 2005–2008
 +81 kg: 2010–

Medal reallocation

Multiple gold medalists
Boldface denotes active amateur boxers and highest medal count among all boxers (including these who not included in these tables) per type.

References

World Amateur Championship medalists
medalists
AIBA